82-84 Windmill Street, Millers Point is a heritage-listed residence and former residence and office located at 82-84 Windmill Street, in the inner city Sydney suburb of Millers Point in the City of Sydney local government area of New South Wales, Australia. It is also known as the Royal College of Pathologists (former) and Terrace. It was added to the New South Wales State Heritage Register on 2 April 1999.

History 
Millers Point is one of the earliest areas of European settlement in Australia, and a focus for maritime activities.

82-84 Windmill Street is a Georgian Revival style Victorian townhouse built , once the home of naturalist John William Brazier, and also part of the Royal College of Physicians.

In 1958 architect John Fisher (member of the Institute of Architects, the Cumberland County Council Historic Buildings Committee and on the first Council of the National Trust of Australia (NSW) after its reformation in 1960), with the help of artist Cedric Flower, convinced Taubmans to paint the central bungalow at 50 Argyle Place. As a result, Fisher was able to negotiate leases for Bligh House (later Clydebank) and houses in Windmill Street for various medical societies.

In 1971, a 20-year lease was granted by the City of Sydney for the use of premises at 82 Windmill Street to the Royal College of Pathologists of Australasia. In 1974 a lease to the College was granted by the City over 84 Windmill Street.

Description 

Victorian Georgian, two storey townhouse with attic and basement. Shutters to all windows, fanlight over front door. Storeys: 2 Construction: Painted rendered masonry, slate roof. Painted timber joinery. Iron lace balustrade. Style: Victorian Georgian.

Condition 
External: Good.

Heritage listing 
As at 23 November 2000, this Victorian Georgian townhouse was constructed . Once the home of noted naturalist John William Brazier, it was also formerly part of the Royal College of Physicians. It is part of the Millers Point Conservation Area, an intact residential and maritime precinct. It contains residential buildings and civic spaces dating from the 1830s and is an important example of 19th century adaptation of the landscape.

82-84 Windmill Street, Millers Point was listed on the New South Wales State Heritage Register on 2 April 1999.

See also 

Australian residential architectural styles
86-88 Windmill Street

References

Bibliography

Attribution

External links

 

New South Wales State Heritage Register sites located in Millers Point
Victorian architecture in Sydney
Office buildings in New South Wales
Houses in Millers Point, New South Wales
Retail buildings in New South Wales
Articles incorporating text from the New South Wales State Heritage Register
1860 establishments in Australia
Houses completed in 1860
Georgian Revival architecture in Australia
Millers Point Conservation Area